The Bell System was a system of telecommunication companies, led by the Bell Telephone Company and later by the American Telephone and Telegraph Company (AT&T), that dominated the telephone services industry in North America for over one hundred years from its creation in 1877 until its antitrust breakup in 1983. The system of companies was often colloquially called Ma Bell (as in "Mother Bell"), as it held a vertical monopoly over telecommunication products and services in most areas of the United States and Canada. At the time of the breakup of the Bell System in the early 1980s, it had assets of $150 billion (equivalent to $ billion in ) and employed over one million people.

Beginning in the 1910s, American antitrust regulators had been observing and accusing the Bell System of abusing its monopoly power, and had brought legal action multiple times over the decades, until in 1974 the Antitrust Division of the U.S. Department of Justice brought a lawsuit against Bell claiming violations of the Sherman Act. In 1982, anticipating that it could not win, AT&T agreed to a Justice Department-mandated consent decree that settled the lawsuit and ordered it to break itself up into seven "Regional Bell Operating Companies" (known as "The Baby Bells"). This ended the existence of the conglomerate in 1984. These Baby Bells became independent companies and several of them are today very large corporations in their own right.

History

In 1877, the American Bell Telephone Company, named after Alexander Graham Bell, opened the first telephone exchange in New Haven, Connecticut. Within a few years local exchange companies were established in every major city in the United States. Use of the Bell System name initially referred to those early telephone franchises and eventually comprised all telephone companies owned by American Telephone & Telegraph, referred to internally as associated companies, regional holding companies, or later Bell operating companies (BOCs).

In 1899, American Telephone & Telegraph (AT&T) acquired the assets of its parent, the American Bell Telephone Company. American Bell had created AT&T to provide long-distance calls between New York and Chicago and beyond. AT&T became the parent of American Bell Telephone Company, and thus the head of the Bell System, because regulatory and tax rules were leaner in New York than in Boston, where American Bell was headquartered. Later, the Bell System and its moniker "Ma Bell" became a term that referred generally to all AT&T companies, of which there were five major divisions:

 AT&T Long Lines, providing long lines to interconnect local exchanges and long-distance calling services, and international lines including submarine cables
 Western Electric Company, Bell's equipment manufacturing arm
 Bell Labs, conducting research and development for AT&T and Western Electric; ownership initially equally split between Western and AT&T
 Bell operating companies, providing local exchange telephone services
AT&T, the American Telephone and Telegraph company, who led the combined enterprise in planning and finance.

In 1913, the federal government challenged the Bell System's growing monopoly over the phone system under AT&T ownership in an anti-trust suit, leading to the Kingsbury Commitment. Under the commitment, AT&T escaped break-up or nationalization in exchange for divesting itself of Western Union and allowing non-competing independent telephone companies to interconnect with its long-distance network. After 1934, the Federal Communications Commission (FCC) assumed regulation of AT&T.

Proliferation of telephone service allowed the company to become the largest corporation in the world until its dismantling by the United States Department of Justice in 1984, at which time the Bell System ceased to exist.

Formation under Bell patent

Receiving a U.S. patent for the invention of the telephone on March 7, 1876, Alexander Graham Bell formed the Bell Telephone Company in 1877, which in 1885 became AT&T.

When Bell's original patent expired 15 years later in 1894, the telephone market opened to competition and 6,000 new telephone companies started while the Bell Telephone company took a significant financial downturn.

On April 30, 1907, Theodore Newton Vail returned as President of AT&T. Vail believed in the superiority of one national telephone system and AT&T adopted the slogan One Policy, One System, Universal Service. This became the company's philosophy for the next 70 years. Under Vail, AT&T began acquiring many of the smaller telephone companies including Western Union telegraph.

Kingsbury Commitment
Anxious to avoid action from government antitrust suits, in 1913 AT&T entered into an out-of-court agreement known as the Kingsbury Commitment with the federal government. AT&T committed to sell its $30 million in Western Union capital stock, allow competitors to interconnect with its system, and not acquire other independent companies without permission from the Interstate Commerce Commission.

Nationwide monopoly
The Bell trademark pictured here was used from 1921 through 1969 by both the AT&T corporation and the regional operating corporations to co-brand themselves under a single Bell System trademark. For each regional operating company, its name was placed where "name of associated company" appears in this template version of the trademark.

Bell system telephones and related equipment were made by Western Electric, a wholly owned subsidiary of AT&T Co. Member telephone companies paid a fixed fraction of their revenues as a license fee to Bell Labs.

As a result of this vertical monopoly, the Bell System effectively owned most telephone service in the United States by 1940, from local and long-distance service to the telephones. This allowed Bell to prohibit its customers from connecting equipment not made or sold by Bell to the system without paying fees. For example, if a customer desired a style of telephone not leased by the local Bell company, the customer was required to purchase the instrument at cost, furnish it to the telephone company for rewiring, pay a service charge, and a monthly lease fee for using it.

In 1949, the United States Department of Justice alleged in an antitrust lawsuit that AT&T and the Bell System operating companies were using their near-monopoly in telecommunications to attempt to establish unfair advantage in related technologies. The outcome was a 1956 consent decree limiting AT&T to 85% of the United States' national telephone network and certain government contracts, and from continuing to hold interests in Canada and the Caribbean. The Bell System's Canadian operations included the Bell Canada regional operating company and the Northern Electric manufacturing subsidiary of the Bell System's Western Electric equipment manufacturer. Western Electric divested Northern Electric in 1956, but AT&T did not divest itself of Bell Canada until 1975. ITT Inc., then known as International Telephone & Telegraph Co., purchased the Bell System's Caribbean regional operating companies.

The consent decree also forced Bell to make all of its patents royalty-free. This led to substantial increases in innovation, in particular in the electronics and computer sectors. Steven Weber's The Success of Open Source characterizes the consent decree as important in fostering the open source movement.

The Bell System also owned various Caribbean regional operating companies, as well as 54% of Japan's NEC and a post-World War II reconstruction relationship with state-owned Nippon Telegraph and Telephone (NTT) before the 1956 boundaries were emplaced. Before 1956, the Bell System's reach was truly gargantuan. Even during the period from 1956 to 1984, the Bell System's dominant reach into all forms of communications was pervasive within the United States and influential in telecommunication standardization throughout the industrialized world.

The 1984 Bell System divestiture brought an end to the affiliation branded as the Bell System. It resulted from another antitrust lawsuit filed by the U.S. Department of Justice in 1974, alleging illegal practices by the Bell System companies to stifle competition in the telecommunications industry. The parties settled the lawsuit on January 8, 1982, superseding the former restrictions that AT&T and the DOJ had agreed upon in 1956.

Subsidiaries

Pre-1956 international holdings
Before the 1956 break-up, the Bell System included the companies listed below, plus those listed in the pre-1984 section. Northern Electric and the Caribbean regional operating companies were considered part of the Bell System proper before the break-up. Nippon Electric was considered a more distant affiliate of Western Electric, and through its own research and development adapted the designs of Western Electric's North American telecommunications equipment for use in Japan, which to this day gives much of Japan's telephone equipment and network a closer resemblance to North American ANSI and iconectiv standards than to European-originated ITU-T standards. Before the 1956 break-up, Northern Electric was focused on manufacturing, without significant telecommunication-equipment research & development of its own. The operation of Japan's NTT during the post-World War II occupation was considered an administrative adjunct to the North American Bell System.

 Nortel Networks Corporation, formerly Northern Telecom, an equipment-manufacturing company 
 Northern Electric, a former telecommunications equipment-manufacturing subsidiary of Western Electric
 Dominion Electric, a former recording equipment-manufacturing company
 Various former Caribbean regional operating companies, sold to ITT
 NEC, an equipment-manufacturing company in Japan
 Nippon Electric, a former telecommunications equipment-manufacturing company 54% owned by Western Electric
 NTT, a telecommunications company in Japan that was administered by AT&T as part of General Douglas MacArthur's post-WWII reconstruction

Pre-1984 breakup

Immediately before the 1984 break-up, the Bell System had the following corporate structure:
 American Telephone and Telegraph Company, a holding company and long-distance carrier
 Illinois Bell Telephone Company
 Indiana Bell Telephone Company, Incorporated
 Michigan Bell Telephone Company
 New England Telephone and Telegraph Company
 New Jersey Bell Telephone Company
 New York Telephone Company
 Northwestern Bell Telephone Company
 Pacific Northwest Bell Telephone Company
 South Central Bell Telephone Company
 Southern Bell Telephone and Telegraph Company
 Southwestern Bell Telephone Company
 The Bell Telephone Company of Pennsylvania
 The Chesapeake and Potomac Telephone Company
 The Chesapeake and Potomac Telephone Company of Maryland
 The Chesapeake and Potomac Telephone Company of West Virginia
 The Chesapeake and Potomac Telephone Company of Virginia
 The Diamond State Telephone Company
 The Mountain States Telephone and Telegraph Company
 Malheur Home Telephone Company
 The Ohio Bell Telephone Company
 The Pacific Telephone and Telegraph Company
 Bell Telephone Company of Nevada
 Wisconsin Telephone Company
Other subsidiaries:
 Bell Canada (1880–1975)
 Northern Electric (equipment manufacturing in Canada)  (1914–1956)
 Western Electric Co., Inc. (equipment manufacturing)
 Bell Telephone Laboratories, Inc. (R&D (research & development), co-owned between AT&T and Western Electric)
 Cincinnati Bell, Inc. (22.7% owned)
 The Southern New England Telephone Company (16.8% owned)
 Bellcomm, Inc. (1963–1972; formed to support the Apollo program)

1984
On January 1, 1984, the former components of the Bell System were structured into the following Regional Bell Operating Companies (RBOCs), which became known as Baby Bells.
American Information Technologies Corporation, branded as Ameritech
Illinois Bell Telephone Company
Indiana Bell Telephone Company, Incorporated
Michigan Bell Telephone Company
The Ohio Bell Telephone Company
Wisconsin Bell, Inc.
American Telephone and Telegraph Company
AT&T Communications, Inc.
AT&T Information Systems, Inc.
AT&T Technologies, Inc.
Bell Telephone Laboratories, Inc.
Bell Atlantic Corporation
New Jersey Bell Telephone Company
The Bell Telephone Company of Pennsylvania
The Chesapeake and Potomac Telephone Company
The Chesapeake and Potomac Telephone Company of Maryland
The Chesapeake and Potomac Telephone Company of West Virginia
The Chesapeake and Potomac Telephone Company of Virginia
The Diamond State Telephone Company
Bell Communications Research, Inc., owned equally by all of the Baby Bells
BellSouth Corporation
Southern Bell Telephone and Telegraph Company
South Central Bell Telephone Company
Cincinnati Bell, Inc.
Cincinnati Bell Telephone Company
NYNEX Corporation
New York Telephone Company
New England Telephone and Telegraph Company
Pacific Telesis Group
Pacific Bell Telephone Company
Nevada Bell Telephone Company
Southwestern Bell Corporation
Southwestern Bell Telephone CompanyThe Southern New England Telephone CompanyU S WEST, Inc.Northwestern Bell Telephone Company
Pacific Northwest Bell Telephone Company
The Mountain States Telephone and Telegraph Company
Malheur Home Telephone Company

Today
After 1984, multiple mergers occurred of the operating companies and between them, so that some components of the former Bell System are now owned by companies independent of the historic Bell System, including foreign telecommunications firms. The structure of the companies today is as follows.

Remaining "Regional Bell Operating Companies"
 AT&T Inc., a holding company
 AT&T Corp., a current subsidiary
 AT&T Teleholdings, Inc. (formerly Ameritech Corporation), a current subsidiary, also includes now defunct Pacific Telesis
 Illinois Bell Telephone Company, a regional LEC
 Indiana Bell Telephone Company, Incorporated, a currently existing regional LEC
 Michigan Bell Telephone Company, a regional LEC
 Pacific Bell Telephone Company, a regional LEC
 Nevada Bell Telephone Company, a regional LEC, omitted from the MFJ
 The Ohio Bell Telephone Company, a regional LEC
 Wisconsin Bell, Inc., a regional LEC
 BellSouth LLC, a current subsidiary. Its two operating companies merged into one:
 BellSouth Telecommunications, LLC, a regional LEC, includes Southern Bell & South Central Bell
 Southwestern Bell Telephone Company, a regional LEC
 Verizon Communications, Inc., formerly Bell Atlantic Corporation, a holding company
 NYNEX LLC, a former RBOC holding company
 Verizon New England, Inc., a regional LEC
 Verizon New York, Inc., a regional LEC
 Verizon Delaware LLC, a regional LEC
 Verizon Maryland, Inc., a regional LEC
 Verizon New Jersey, Inc., a regional LEC
 Verizon Pennsylvania, Inc., a regional LEC
 Verizon Washington, D.C., Inc., a regional LEC
 Verizon Virginia, Inc., a regional LEC
 Lumen Technologies, Inc. (formerly CenturyLink, Inc.), an independent LEC holding company
 Qwest Communications International, Inc., a holding company acquired in 2011; originally a non-Bell company, acquired and merged U S WEST in 2000.
 Qwest Services Corporation, a holding company within the Qwest corporate structure
 Qwest Corporation, a regional LEC, originally Mountain Bell, includes defunct Malheur Bell, Northwestern Bell, Pacific Northwest Bell
Other "Bell Operating Companies"

The following telephone companies are considered independent of the Baby Bells:
 Cincinnati Bell, Inc., an independent LEC holding company
 Cincinnati Bell Telephone Company LLC, a LEC of which AT&T owned 27.8% before 1984 and thus was left separate in the 1984 break-upConsolidated Communications Holdings, Inc., an independent LEC holding company
 FairPoint Communications, Inc., an LEC holding company sold to Consolidated in 2017
 Consolidated Communications of Northern New England Company LLC, a regional LEC created when Verizon New England lines in Maine and New Hampshire were sold to FairPoint in 2008
 Consolidated Communications of Vermont Company LLC, a regional LEC created when Verizon New England lines in Vermont were sold to FairPoint in 2008
 Frontier Communications Corporation, an independent LEC holding company
 Frontier Communications ILEC Holdings, Inc., an LEC holding company created by Verizon and sold to Frontier in 2010
 Frontier West Virginia, Inc., a regional LEC, formerly C&P Telephone of West Virginia
 The Southern New England Telephone Company, a regional LEC that AT&T owned 16.8% of before 1984 and thus was left separate by the 1984 break-up (subsequently acquired by SBC and then sold to Frontier by the new AT&T after the SBC-AT&T merger)

 Other "Bell System" companies
The following companies were divested after 1984 from AT&T Corp. or the Baby Bells and do not provide telephone service.
 Lucent Technologies, a research and equipment manufacturing company spun-off in 1995; merged with French company Alcatel in 2006 to form Alcatel-Lucent which was acquired by Finland's Nokia Corporation in 2016
 Western Electric Company, Incorporated, a former telecommunications and recording equipment-manufacturing company that ceased to have that name as of the 1984 break-up
 Alcatel-Lucent Bell, a subsidiary of Alcatel-Lucent that was founded in Antwerp, Belgium in 1882, by Western Electric; came into Alcatel-Lucent ownership via ITT and Alcatel
 Bell Telephone Laboratories, Inc., the former AT&T-corporate research unit known as Bell Labs: also spun-off to Lucent Technologies, became Nokia Bell Labs in 2016
 Avaya, Inc., an equipment manufacturing company spun-off from Lucent in 2000
 LSI Corporation, a holding company
 Agere Systems, incorporated in 2000, the former Micro Electronics subsidiary of Lucent; was then spun-off in 2002 and acquired by LSI in 2007
 Systimax Solutions', the Western Electric Structured Cabling unit, once part of AT&T Network Systems, was spun-off from Avaya in 2002 and became part of CommScope
 iconectiv, formerly known as Telcordia and Bell Communications Research (Bellcore)

Beginning in 1991, the Baby Bells began to consolidate operations or rename their Bell Operating Companies according to the parent company name, such as "Bell Atlantic – Delaware, Inc." or "U S WEST Communications, Inc.", to unify their corporate images.

Present-day usage of the Bell name
The Bell System service marks, including the circled-bell logo, especially as redesigned by Saul Bass in 1969, and the words Bell System in text, were used before January 1, 1984, when the AT&T divestiture of its regional operating companies took effect. The word mark Bell'', the logo, and other related trademarks, are held by each of the remaining Bell companies, namely AT&T, Verizon, CenturyLink, and Cincinnati Bell. International rights to the marks, except for Canada, are held by a joint venture of these companies, Bell IP Holdings.

Of the various resulting 1984 spinoffs, only BellSouth actively used and promoted the Bell name and logo during its entire history, from the 1984 break-up to its reunion with the new AT&T in 2006. Similarly, cessation of using either the Bell name or logo occurred for many of the other companies more than a decade after the 1984 break-up as part of an acquisition-related rebranding. The others have only used the marks on rare occasions to maintain their trademark rights, even less now that they have adopted names conceived long after divestiture. Examples include Verizon, which still used the Bell logo on its trucks and payphones until it updated its own logo in 2015, and Qwest, formerly US West, which licenses the Northwestern Bell and Mountain Bell names to Unical Enterprises, who makes telephones under the Northwestern Bell name.

In 1984, each regional Bell operating company was assigned a set list of names it was allowed to use in combination with the Bell marks. Aside from Cincinnati Bell, all these Bell System names have disappeared from the United States business landscape.  Southwestern Bell used both the Bell name and the circled-bell trademark until SBC opted for all of its companies to do business under the "SBC" name in 2002. Bell Atlantic used the Bell name and circled-bell trademark until renaming itself Verizon in 2000. Pacific Bell continued operating in California under that name (or the shortened "PacBell" nickname) until SBC purchased it.

In Canada, Bell Canada (divested from AT&T in 1975) continues to use the Bell name. For the decades that Nortel was named Northern Telecom, its research and development arm was Bell Northern Research. Bell Canada and its holding-company parent, Bell Canada Enterprises, still use the Bell name and used variations of the circled-bell logo until 1977, which until 1976 strongly resembled the 1921 to 1939 Bell System trademark shown above.

See also

 Bell Memorial
 Independent telephone company
 The Telephone Cases
 Bell System Practices

References

External links
 Bell.com
 Bell System Memorial
 Blue Bell Telephone Sign History — New England Telephone and Telegraph
 Investopedia: Baby Bells

 
Alexander Graham Bell
Defunct telecommunications companies of the United States
AT&T subsidiaries
Companies disestablished in 1984
Telecommunications monopolies
American companies disestablished in 1984
Telecommunications companies disestablished in 1984